Degenerative disease is the result of a continuous process based on degenerative cell changes, affecting tissues or organs, which will increasingly deteriorate over time.

In neurodegenerative diseases, cells of the central nervous system stop working or die via neurodegeneration. An example of this is Alzheimer's disease. The other two common groups of degenerative diseases are those that affect circulatory system (e.g. coronary artery disease) and neoplastic diseases (e.g. cancers).

Many degenerative diseases exist and some are related to aging. Normal bodily wear or lifestyle choices (such as exercise or eating habits) may worsen degenerative diseases, but this depends on the disease. Sometimes the main or partial cause behind such diseases is genetic. Thus some are clearly hereditary like Huntington's disease. Sometimes the cause is viruses, poisons or other chemicals. The cause may also be unknown.

Some degenerative diseases can be cured, but not always. It might still be possible to alleviate the symptoms.

Examples

 Alzheimer's disease (AD)
 Amyotrophic lateral sclerosis (ALS, Lou Gehrig's disease)
 Cancers
 Charcot–Marie–Tooth disease (CMT)
 Chronic traumatic encephalopathy
 Cystic fibrosis
 Some cytochrome c oxidase deficiencies (often the cause of degenerative Leigh syndrome)
 Ehlers–Danlos syndrome
 Fibrodysplasia ossificans progressiva
 Friedreich's ataxia
 Frontotemporal dementia (FTD)
 Some cardiovascular diseases (e.g. atherosclerotic ones like coronary artery disease, aortic stenosis, congenital defects etc.)
 Huntington's disease
 Infantile neuroaxonal dystrophy
 Keratoconus (KC)
 Keratoglobus
 Leukodystrophies
 Macular degeneration (AMD)
 Marfan's syndrome (MFS)
 Some mitochondrial myopathies
 Mitochondrial DNA depletion syndrome
 Mueller–Weiss syndrome
 Multiple sclerosis (MS)
 Multiple system atrophy
 Muscular dystrophies (MD)
 Neuronal ceroid lipofuscinosis
 Niemann–Pick diseases
 Osteoarthritis
 Osteoporosis
 Parkinson's disease
 Pulmonary arterial hypertension
 All prion diseases (Creutzfeldt-Jakob disease, fatal familial insomnia etc.)
 Progressive supranuclear palsy
 Retinitis pigmentosa (RP)
 Rheumatoid arthritis
 Sandhoff Disease
 Spinal muscular atrophy (SMA, motor neuron disease)
 Subacute sclerosing panencephalitis
 Substance Use Disorder
 Tay–Sachs disease
 Vascular dementia (might not itself be neurodegenerative, but often appears alongside other forms of degenerative dementia)

See also
 Life extension
 Senescence
 Progressive disease
 List of genetic disorders

References

Diseases and disorders
Senescence
Ageing processes